Darreh Par (also known as Darreh Bar) is a village in Masabi Rural District, in the Central District of Sarayan County, South Khorasan Province, Iran. At the 2006 census, its population was 54, in 22 families.

References 

Populated places in Sarayan County